The Italian general election of 1963 took place on 28 April 1963.

Christian Democracy (DC) was by far the largest party in Veneto with 52.7% of the vote.

Results

Chamber of Deputies
Source: Regional Council of Veneto

Provincial breakdown
Source: Regional Council of Veneto

Senate
Source: Regional Council of Veneto

Elections in Veneto
General, Veneto